Pyrausta aerealis is a species of moth in the family Crambidae described by Jacob Hübner in 1793. It is found in most of Europe (except Portugal, Ireland, Great Britain, the Benelux, Norway, the Czech Republic, Croatia and Hungary). It has also been recorded from Kyrgyzstan, Kazakhstan, Afghanistan, China and Algeria.

The wingspan is 18–26 mm.

The larvae have been recorded feeding on Artemisia vulgaris, Thymus serpyllum, Scrophularia, Gnaphalium, Helichrysum and Thalictrum species.

References

Moths described in 1793
aerealis
Moths of Europe
Moths of Asia